Stade Municipal de Bamako is located in Bamako, Mali. It is used mostly for football and serves as the home stadium of AS Bamako.  The stadium has a capacity of 5,000

Football venues in Mali
Buildings and structures in Bamako